The Bayer designation Pi Pegasi (π Peg / π Pegasi) is shared by two stars, in the constellation Pegasus:

π1 Pegasi
π2 Pegasi

References

Pegasi, Pi
Pegasus (constellation)